Rzędziwojowice  is a village in the administrative district of Gmina Niemodlin, within Opole County, Opole Voivodeship, in south-western Poland.

Village name Geppersdorf is also the German name for an unrelated Czech village of Linhartovy (pl) (de) to the south of Poland.

References

External links 
 Jewish Community in Rzędziwojowice on Virtual Shtetl

Villages in Opole County
Holocaust locations in Poland